Harold Thomas may refer to:
Harold Thomas (artist) (born 1947), Indigenous Australian artist and activist, designer of the Aboriginal Australian flag
Harold Thomas (rugby) (1914–1989), Welsh dual-code international rugby union and rugby league footballer
Harold Thomas (rugby union) (1883–1947), Welsh rugby forward
Harold Chester Thomas (1907–1942), U.S. Navy officer
Harold Thomas (boxer) (1909–1933), New Zealand Olympic boxer
Harold Wolferstan Thomas (1875–1931), Canadian doctor

See also

Harry Thomas (disambiguation)